Quod licet Iovi, non licet bovi is a Latin phrase, literally "What is permissible for Jupiter is not permissible for cows". The locus classicus (origin) for the phrase is the novella Memoirs of a Good-for-Nothing (1826) by Joseph Freiherr von Eichendorff, although it is not entirely clear that Eichendorff coined the phrase himself. In his play Heauton Timorumenos, Terence, a playwright of the Roman Republic, coined a similar phrase, Aliis si licet, tibi non licet ("to others it is permitted; to you it is not permitted").

The phrase is often translated as "Gods may do what cattle may not". It indicates the existence of a double standard (justifiable or otherwise), and essentially means "what is permitted to one important person or group, is not permitted to everyone."

See also 
 The Ass and the Lapdog by Aesop
 "All animals are equal but some animals are more equal than others" in Animal Farm
 List of Latin phrases

References 

Latin words and phrases
1820s neologisms
Quotations from literature
Metaphors referring to cattle
Cattle in religion